Kamaal Williams (born Henry Wu, 1989) is a British musician and record producer. Williams rose to prominence alongside drummer Yussef Dayes in 2016 as one half of the short-lived London-based jazz group Yussef Kamaal following the release of the duo's debut album, Black Focus, which earned them the 'Breakthrough Act' award at the 2017 Jazz FM awards. He released two solo albums under his record label Black Focus, including The Return (2018) and Wu Hen (2020). In addition to live instrumentation, Williams also releases electronic music under his given name Henry Wu.

Life and career

1989–2012: Early life and career beginnings
Williams was born as Henry Wu in 1989, in Peckham, South London to a Taiwanese mother and British father who both worked as architects. Growing up, Williams took an interest in learning Mandarin and Chinese calligraphy. From an early age, Williams was involved with a number of creative pursuits. His interest in calligraphy, as well as his parents' involvement with graphic design, contributed to an interest in street art and graffiti culture, an influence which is reflected in the album art of later projects such as Black Focus and The Return. Because of his mixed race, Williams struggled to connect with British culture, but was able to resonate with West African and Jamaican communities in Peckham.

Williams took an early interest in music. In primary school, he learnt drums and percussion which he played in the school band. It was during this time that Williams cultivated a formative grounding in jazz, funk and house music. His father introduced him to jazz with songs by Miles Davis and John Coltrane. Alongside an interest in jazz, Williams also developed a taste for garage and grime music. After attending high school, Williams attended the Bermondsey Centre of Southwark College, where he studied music production and learned to play the keyboard.

Around this time, Williams began gigging regularly around London and, aged 17, started a band with Katy B alongside drummer Joshua McKenzie.  In 2008, Williams put on a show with the then fourteen-year-old drummer Yussef Dayes. Williams remained with Katy B for two years before leaving the band to focus on his own music.

2013–2017: Early releases and Black Focus
From 2013 onward, Williams released house and broken beat music under the name Henry Wu. In the same year, Williams assisted Saxophonist Tenderlonious in establishing 22a, a London-based, artist-run record label. In 2015, Williams collaborated with fellow London based producer, K15, to produce an EP entitled WU15. In the following year, Williams recruited both Dayes and Cawthorne to perform at the 2016 Worldwide Awards hosted by London DJ and broadcaster Gilles Peterson. Williams and Dayes were subsequently signed to Peterson's independent label, Brownswood Recordings.

The duo released their only studio album, Black Focus, under the name Yussef Kamaal in November 2016. The album was met with critical acclaim. Clash Music described the sound as "exceptional, vital" and "enthralling"; whilst Canadian magazine Exclaim! described it simply as "dope". The album was widely praised for its unique blend of sounds traditionally associated with jazz, hip hop and breakbeat music. Williams revealed that large amounts of the album were improvised in the studio, and emphasised the importance of musical dialogue between the musicians in structuring the performances. The album was engineered by Malcolm Catto of The Heliocentrics and recorded at his studio in London. Williams praised his "old school" approach to recording and crediting him with mixing two of the tracks on the album.

Williams and Dayes collaborated for a brief and tumultuous period following the album's release. Shortly before embarking on a tour of the United States, the band were refused entry to the country after Dayes' visa was revoked in accordance with an executive immigration order implemented by the Trump Administration. Several weeks later, the duo announced their split. On his split with Dayes, Williams commented: "Nothing has really ended; it travelled into something new and fresh now."  From 2017 to 2020, Williams hosted a monthly radio show on NTS Radio as Henry Wu, playing a selection of music from his influences and associated acts in the London scene.

2018–present: The Return and Wu Hen 
In the years following, Williams established his own label, Black Focus Records. Less than two years after the release of Black Focus, Williams enlisted the services of former bandmate and drummer Josh 'MckNasty' McKenzie and bassist Pete Martin to produce his solo bandleader debut, The Return. The album was recorded in the South London house Williams grew up in. The album was recorded over the course of a week. Recording engineer Richard Samuels remarked that, despite having the opportunity to record in professional studios, the performance of the musicians in a familiar and comfortable environment was conducive to a "free flowing album".

The Return was received as a "sequel" to Black Focus and charted in the UK at number 63. The album holds an aggregated score of 76 on Metacritic, indicating "generally favourable" reviews. The album was praised for its blend of genres, a sound Williams has called "a London thing". Pitchfork praised the album for its sonic palette, and offered light criticism with respect to the brevity of some of the tracks. The album peaked at sixty-three on the UK charts. The release of The Return prompted Williams' first global tour, spanning across the UK, Europe, Australia, and New Zealand, with former bandmate Mansur Brown as support. Brown would also be the second artist under Black Focus Records. The staff of Mixmag ranked Black Focus Records as number one in its list of the Best Record Labels of 2018.

The album was supported by the release of a music video for Salaam, the album's opening track. The video was directed by Greg Barnes and was shot in Marrakesh, Morocco, which according to Williams, "is a special place for me, [going there is] a huge inspiration for my work." Williams dedicated the album to the victims of the Grenfell Tower fire of 2017. Following the album's release, The Return was remixed by Snips with vocal samples from the Wu-Tang Clan. The Return was nominated for 'Independent Album of the Year' at the 2018 AIM Independent Music Awards.

Williams released a music video for the song "New Heights (Visions of Aisha Malik)" in 2019. It was also directed by Barnes and Its visuals take inspiration from Martial Arts.

In 2020, Williams released his second album Wu Hen.

His third studio album titled Strings had been announced, where with it, he intends to "integrate more oriental imagery and add more melodic elements."

Musical style 
Williams prioritises rhythm in his music. Having previously been a drummer, Williams aims to bring a percussive approach to the keyboard. He was initially influenced in producing hip hop in the style of 90s boom bap.

Williams' sound on Black Focus and The Return has been called a blend of several genres, among them jazz, funk, hip hop, grime, garage and broken beat.

Despite influences such as Miles Davis, John Coltrane and Herbie Hancock, Williams has rejected the term 'jazz' being applied to his music, citing the "elitist" and traditionalist connotations it evokes. He has instead opted to create music under the eponymous genre of 'Wu funk'. Piotor Orlov of NPR said that "[Williams'] 'jazz' is grounded in post-Mwandishi Herbie Hancock, Bob James' "Nautilus" and J Dilla productions." Williams has also listed Jamiroquai, Roy Ayers, Donald Byrd, the 2001 album Execute by Oxide & Neutrino, and his home city of London as influences on his music. Williams said that The Return represents all of London, in that the various contributors came from a diverse cross-section of the city's areas.

When playing live, Williams said that he with his own band "completely improvise with the base of the song. On the night we don’t know how it’s going to sound. Spontaneous and loose in the structure, it allows us to express ourselves. We just let it roll out." When Williams performed with Dayes in Yussef Kamaal, Jochan Embley wrote in a 2017 gig review that "When you see the south London duo play together, with that preternatural ability to predict and effortlessly follow whichever direction the other is about to fly off into, you’d think they had been playing together for a lifetime."

Instruments 

On his album The Return, Williams has used a Nord Electro keyboard, a Roland Juno 106 and a Wurlitzer piano.

Personal life 
Williams adopted the name Kamaal (meaning "perfect") upon converting to Islam in 2011, and stringed it with his father's surname. According to a 2018 interview, Williams said that religion has played a key role in his career, reminding him to remain humble and grateful in the face of success. The doctrinal principles of Islam are the "foundations" of Williams' beliefs, and, according to the artist, "translate into his music". In a 2018 interview, Williams said on the topic of changing his name: "...as a creative it just allows you to express yourself in a different way. Henry Wu is my ethnic background, and Kamaal is my spiritual background." In another interview with The Indian Express, Williams stated: "Kamaal Williams is more like a conceptual band, and Henry Wu is the DJ, the producer, the mastermind".

Discography

As Henry Wu 
 Stir Fry Beats (2012)
 Natural Complexion (2014)
 Negotiate EP (2015)
 Good Morning Peckham (2015)
 Motions Of Wu Vol. 1 (2015)
 27 Karat Years (with Tito Wun) (2016)
 Henry Wu & Banton (2016)
 Deep in the Mud (with Banton (2017)
 Projections EP (with Earl Jeffers) (2018)
 Shades Of Wu: The Anthology (2020)
 Phone Call (2022)

With Yussef Kamaal 
 Black Focus (2016)

As Kamaal Williams 
 The Return (2018)
 Wu Hen (2020)

Collaborations

WU15 
 WU15 (2015)

DJ mix albums 
 DJ-Kicks: Kamaal Williams (2019)

Soundtrack contributions 
 Boogie (2021)

References 

Living people
Brownswood Recordings artists
People from Peckham
Acid jazz musicians
British Muslims
21st-century English musicians
British male drummers
English people of Taiwanese descent
British jazz keyboardists
21st-century English male musicians
1989 births
Converts to Islam